South Garo Hills is an administrative district in the state of Meghalaya in India. As of 2011 it is the least populous district of Meghalaya (out of 7).  The district was established in 1992.

Geography
The district headquarters are located at Baghmara. The district occupies an area of 1850 km2. South Garo Hills has only 5 assembly constituency at that time but presently it has 3.

Economy
In 2006 the Ministry of Panchayati Raj named South Garo Hills one of the country's 250 most backward districts (out of a total of 640). It is one of the three districts in Meghalaya currently receiving funds from the Backward Regions Grant Fund Programme (BRGF).

Districts

Administrative divisions
South Garo Hills district is divided into four blocks:

Demographics
According to the 2011 census South Garo Hills district has a population of 142,334, roughly equal to the nation of Saint Lucia. This gives it a ranking of 604th in India (out of a total of 640). Its population growth rate over the decade 2001-2011 was  41.19%. South Garo Hills has a sex ratio of 944 females for every 1000 males, and a literacy rate of 72.39%. Scheduled Tribes make up 94.31% of the population.

Languages

Garo is the main language. Some speakers of other languages record their language as Garo in the census. Languages spoken here include A'Tong, a Tibeto-Burman language spoken by 10,000 people in Bangladesh and India.

Flora and fauna
It shares Nokrek National Park (established in 1986) with two other districts.

It is also home to the Siju and Baghmara Pitcher Plant Wildlife Sanctuaries.

At least one species of gecko, Cyrtodactylus karsticolus is endemic to the area.

References

External links
Official district government website

 
Districts of Meghalaya
1992 establishments in Meghalaya
Autonomous regions of India